Events in the year 1992 in Namibia.

Incumbents 

 President: Sam Nujoma
 Prime Minister: Hage Geingob
 Chief Justice of Namibia: Hans Joachim Berker (until 5 July), Ismael Mahomed (from 5 July)

Events 
 9 May - Michelle McLean, Miss Namibia, is crowned Miss Universe at Bangkok, Thailand. Is the first and only time that Namibia wins the contest. 
 Barcelona Olympic Games - Frankie Fredericks wins the two first olympic medals for Namibia, the both in athletism.
 30 November – 3 December – Local Authority Council and Regional Council Elections were held in the country.

Deaths

References 

 
1990s in Namibia
Years of the 20th century in Namibia
Namibia
Namibia